Jumanji: Welcome to the Jungle is a 2017 American fantasy adventure comedy film directed by Jake Kasdan from a screenplay by Chris McKenna, Erik Sommers, Scott Rosenberg, and Jeff Pinkner. The film is the third installment in the Jumanji film series and the indirect sequel to Jumanji (1995). It stars Dwayne Johnson, Jack Black, Kevin Hart, Karen Gillan, Nick Jonas, and Bobby Cannavale. The story focuses on a group of teenagers who come across Jumanji, now transformed into a video game twenty-two years after the events of the 1995 film. They find themselves trapped in the game as a set of adult avatars, seeking to complete a quest alongside another player who has been trapped since 1996.

Principal photography began in Honolulu in September 2016 and ended in Atlanta in December, with the film containing notable references to the first film as a tribute to its lead actor Robin Williams. Jumanji: Welcome to the Jungle, premiered at the Grand Rex in Paris on December 5, 2017, and was released in the United States on December 20 by Sony Pictures Releasing. The film received positive reviews from critics, with praise for its humor and performances. It grossed $964.5million worldwide, becoming the fifth-highest-grossing film of 2017. A sequel, Jumanji: The Next Level, was released in December 2019.

Plot 

In 1996, Brantford, New Hampshire, teenager Alex Vreeke receives Jumanji, which was previously disposed of by Alan Parrish and Sarah Whittle in 1969, from his father who discovered it at the coast. Uninterested, Alex sets it aside, only to find it transformed into a video game cartridge later that night. Opting to play the game, he is suddenly sucked inside upon choosing a character. His disappearance results in his father becoming despondent and their home falling into disrepair.

Twenty-one years later in 2017, four Brantford High School students – awkward Spencer Gilpin, athletic Anthony "Fridge" Johnson, ditzy Bethany Walker, and rebellious Martha Kaply – are sent by Principal Bentley to clean the school's basement for detention – Bethany for using her phone during a quiz, Martha for insulting the gym teacher, and Spencer and Fridge for the former writing the latter's essay for him. Fridge discovers Alex's discarded video game system, which he and Spencer decide to play and encourage the girls to join them. Upon starting the game, they are sucked into Jumanji, landing in a jungle as their chosen characters – Spencer as muscular explorer and archaeologist Dr. Xander "Smolder" Bravestone, Fridge as diminutive zoologist Franklin "Mouse" Finbar, Bethany as male cartographer and paleontologist Professor Sheldon "Shelly" Oberon, and Martha as martial arts expert Ruby Roundhouse.

While coming to terms with their situation, the group find three marks on their arms denoting lives. Spencer theorizes that if they lose all three, they will permanently expire. The group encounter the game's NPC guide Nigel Billingsley, who provides them with the game's narrative and their characters' backstories. The group learn that their goal is to end a curse on Jumanji, brought about by corrupt archaeologist Professor Van Pelt after he stole a magical jewel called the "Jaguar's Eye" from its shrine and gained control of all the jungle's animals, casting a terrible curse upon Jumanji. Nigel hands Spencer the jewel, having stolen it from Van Pelt, and before driving off he instructs the group to return it to a statue at the shrine and call out "Jumanji" to lift the curse and leave the game.

Coping with their avatars, their "weaknesses", Van Pelt's men, and losing several lives along the way (including Spencer losing one as a result of a heated argument between him and Fridge over the former inadvertently costing the latter his place in their school's football team due to the forged essay), the group encounter Alex operating the fifth avatar – pilot Jefferson "Seaplane" McDonough – who takes them to a treehouse that Alan Parrish built during his tenure in Jumanji after saving them from Van Pelt's men. Upon realizing his identity, the group is collectively shocked upon learning how long he has been trapped in the game, although Alex thought he'd only been there a few months due to the game's floating timeline. Now with a common goal, the group vows to help Alex return home with them.

Dealing with further problems while heading for the shrine, the group coordinate to overcome them. They eventually reach the shrine, but Van Pelt corners them. Working together, Fridge, Bethany, and Alex distract him while Spencer and Martha outmaneuver him with the game's mechanics, returning the jewel to the statue. Upon calling out Jumanji, the group ends the curse which in turn destroys Van Pelt and, after sharing a handshake with Nigel, return to the real world.

Returning to the school basement, the foursome find Alex is not with them. While walking home, they unexpectedly find the Vreeke home restored and decorated for a Christmas family gathering. The group is greeted by Alex, now an adult, who explains that he managed to miraculously return to 1996, which allowed him to lead a married life with two children. He has a son named Andy and his daughter is named after Bethany as a thank you when she revived him with one of her lives in the game. The four students become friends after their experiences in the game, with Bethany becoming a better person, Spencer and Fridge patching things up, and Spencer starting a relationship with Martha. Later, they destroy the game by dropping a bowling ball they found earlier on it to prevent it from endangering anyone else.

Cast

 Dwayne Johnson as Dr. Xander "Smolder" Bravestone, a strong, confident archaeologist and explorer, and Spencer's avatar in Jumanji.
 Alex Wolff as Spencer Gilpin, an intelligent, unconfident and neurotic high school student.
 Kevin Hart as Franklin "Mouse" Finbar, a diminutive zoologist and weapons carrier, and Fridge's avatar in Jumanji.
 Ser'Darius Blain as Anthony "Fridge" Johnson, a high school football player whose friendship with Spencer has deteriorated due to their different social statuses.
 Jack Black as Professor Sheldon "Shelly" Oberon, an expert in many scientific fields and Bethany's avatar in Jumanji.
 Madison Iseman as Bethany Walker, a popular and vain high school student.
 Karen Gillan as Ruby Roundhouse, a scantily-clad commando and Martha's avatar in Jumanji.
 Morgan Turner as Martha Kaply, a quiet and shy high school student with a cynical intellect. 
 Nick Jonas as Jefferson "Seaplane" McDonough, an aircraft pilot and Alex's avatar in Jumanji.
 Colin Hanks as Alex Vreeke, a family man who was trapped in Jumanji as a teenager (uncredited)
 Mason Guccione as young Alex
 Rhys Darby as Nigel Billingsley, a non-player character in Jumanji who serves as the primary guide for its players
 Bobby Cannavale as Van Pelt, a non-player character in Jumanji presented as a corrupt archaeologist and former partner of Bravestone's. The character is a reimagined version of the Van Pelt character from the 1995 film, originally portrayed by Jonathan Hyde.

Additionally, Marin Hinkle, Tracey Bonner, and Natasha Charles Packer play the mothers of Spencer, Fridge, and Bethany respectively. Appearing as staff members of Brantford High School are Marc Evan Jackson as Principal Bentley, Carlease Burke as history teacher Miss Mathers, Missi Pyle as gym teacher Coach Webb, and Maribeth Monroe as Bethany's English teacher. Kat Altman portrays Bethany's friend Lucinda and Michael Shacket portrays Spencer's friend Fussfeld. William Tokarsky and Rohan Chand appear as a food vendor and a boy, respectively, in the video game's marketplace. Alex's father is played by Sean Buxton in 1996 and an uncredited Tim Matheson in the present day.

Production

Development
Plans for a Jumanji sequel were put ahead by Sony Pictures Entertainment in the late 1990s. As reported by Ain't It Cool News, a stand-alone sequel entitled Jumanji 2 was in development in 1999. The plot of the story involved John Cooper, the President of the United States, buying Jumanji from an old antique store in Europe and bringing it to the White House to play it with his children (one of whom, Butch, just wants a dad not a President for a father). Cooper then gets sucked into the world of Jumanji, paving the way for his evil Vice President, who was supposed to be played by Steve Buscemi, to rise to power as Cooper's replacement. Inside the game, Cooper would have teamed up with hybrid animals, which were going to be animated with CGI; Sony Pictures Consumer Products executive VP of worldwide consumer products Peter Dang revealed prototype drawings of animals that may have appeared in the film, all designed by Ken Ralston, who served as visual effects supervisor in the original film and was planned to make his directorial debut with Jumanji 2, slated for a Christmas 2000 release date. The first film's co-writer, Jonathan Hensleigh, had written the initial draft. Ralston eventually stepped down and the project stalled, albeit the DVD commentary of the first film still references a sequel directed by Ralston. Several other directors and writers came and went on the project, including Steve Oedekerk, Adam Rifkin, David S. Ward, Don Rhymer, and the original author Chris Van Allsburg. Then in 2002, a new iteration of the sequel was reported by Variety. Director Dennis Dugan pitched his own version of the sequel that was said to have utilized the full potential of the board game and would've brought back Robin Williams, who Dugan believed would have more comedic opportunity. Peter Ackerman was being looked at to write. When they were unable to retrieve Williams for the sequel, Sony passed on the project and moved on to develop Zathura.

In July 2012, rumors circulated that a remake of Jumanji was in development. Columbia Pictures president Doug Belgrad said: "We're going to try and reimagine Jumanji and update it for the present". It was confirmed on August 1 that Matthew Tolmach would produce the new version with William Teitler (who produced the original film). In August 2015, Sony Pictures Entertainment announced that the film was scheduled for release on December 25, 2016. Online reception to the news was negative, with some saying that the announcement came too soon after the death of Robin Williams in August 2014 (who played Alan Parrish in the original film). The announcement was criticized by Bradley Pierce (who played Peter Shepherd in Jumanji) and by E! News, which called the remake "unnecessary and kind of insulting". Scott Rosenberg was hired in October 2015 to rewrite the script for the film, whose production was a high priority for the studio. Jake Kasdan was hired to direct the film the following year in January from a script by Rosenberg and Jeff Pinkner based on a draft by original writers Chris McKenna and Erik Sommers.

The film's complete title, Jumanji: Welcome to the Jungle, was confirmed in Cinemacon 2017 held in March. Its plot involved teenagers cleaning out a school's basement who find a vintage video-game version of Jumanji and are sucked into the first film's jungle setting. Although fans debated whether the film was a sequel or a reboot, the second trailer (released that September) indicated that the sequel is set 21 years after the first. Dwayne Johnson noted that the film was inspired by classic video games of the 1990s. The film had used the working title "Jumanji" and the final title and the use of the song "Welcome to the Jungle" was suggested by Jack Black.

Casting
Dwayne Johnson and Kevin Hart were in early talks in April 2016 to star in the film (although both actors had other projects at the time). Johnson confirmed his casting on Instagram later that month. In July, Nick Jonas joined the film's cast with Johnson, Hart, and Jack Black. Black and Hart were paid $5 and $10 million for their involvement, respectively. The following month, Johnson said that the film would not be a reboot but a continuation of the 1995 film; Karen Gillan was announced as part of the cast. On September 20, Ser'Darius Blain was cast as Anthony "Fridge" Johnson and Madison Iseman as Bethany Walker. Two days later, Rhys Darby was cast as Nigel Billingsley, Morgan Turner as Martha Kaply, and Alex Wolff as Spencer Gilpin. In November, Bobby Cannavale announced his casting in the film, and in December, Tim Matheson joined the cast as Old Man Vreeke.

Filming

Principal photography began on September 19, 2016, in Honolulu, Hawaii, primarily at the Kualoa Ranch nature reserve. The film wrapped on December 8 in Atlanta, Georgia.

Music

James Newton Howard was originally signed to compose the film's score, but was replaced by Henry Jackman when the film's release date was postponed six months. The soundtrack was released digitally on 15 December 2017 by Sony Masterworks.

Visual effects
The visual effects are provided by Iloura and Supervised by Glenn Melenhorst with help from Moving Picture Company, Ollin VFX and Rodeo FX.

Release

Theatrical
Sony initially gave the film a release date of December 25, 2016. Since filming did not begin until September 2016, the release was pushed back to July 28 and then to December 20, 2017.

Amazon Prime members in the United States could access to tickets for a December 8 screening of the film at select Regal, National Amusements, ArcLight Cinemas and AMC theaters. The screenings sold out at 1,200 theaters and earned $1.9 million. The film was released on IMAX 2D on January 12, 2018.

In India, the film was released in English, Tamil, Hindi & Telugu languages on December 20, while in China, the film was released on December 29.

Home media
Jumanji: Welcome to the Jungle was released on Digital HD on March 6, 2018, and on DVD, Blu-ray, Blu-ray 3D (excluding North America) and 4K Ultra HD Blu-ray on March 20, although the film was still in theaters. The Blu-ray and digital versions include two additional featurettes: "Surviving the Jungle: Spectacular Stunts!" and "Book to Board Game to Big Screen & Beyond! Celebrating The Legacy of Jumanji". Jumanji: Welcome to the Jungle made a revenue of $65 million from home video sales with 3.4 million units sold, making it the seventh best-selling title of 2018.

In April 2021, Sony signed a deal giving Disney access to their legacy content, including the Jumanji franchise to stream on Disney+ and Hulu and appear on Disney's linear television networks. Disney's access to Sony's titles would come following their availability on Netflix.

Reception

Box office
Jumanji: Welcome to the Jungle grossed $404.6 million in the United States and Canada and $560.7 million in other territories, for a worldwide total of $964.3 million On April 10, 2018, the film passed Spider-Man ($403.7 million) to become Sony's highest-grossing film domestically. On December 25, 2021, Spider-Man: No Way Home surpassed the film at $405 million to become Sony's highest-grossing film domestically. Deadline Hollywood calculated its net profit as $305.7 million when factoring all expenses and revenues, making it 2017's fourth-most-profitable release.

In the U.S. and Canada, the film was released on December 20, 2017, with The Greatest Showman and was projected to gross about $60 million from 3,765 theaters in its six-day opening weekend; the studio predicted a $45 million debut. It earned $7.2 million on its first day and $7.6 million on its second day. Over the three-day weekend, the film grossed $36.2 million (for a six-day total of $71.9 million), finishing second at the box office behind Star Wars: The Last Jedi. Its weekend-only earnings increased to $50.1 million during its second weekend, again finishing in second place at the box office. The 38.4 percent weekend-to-weekend increase was the fourth-largest for a film playing in over 3,000 theaters; The Greatest Showman set the record for best hold the same weekend. The film passed Star Wars: The Last Jedi for the top spot the following weekend, declining 28.1 percent to $36 million, and finished first again the following week with $28.1 million (and a total of $35.2 million over the four-day MLK weekend). Jumanji: Welcome to the Jungle remained atop the box office for its third weekend, earning $19.5 million.

It again topped the box office for a fourth consecutive week (its sixth week overall in theatres) with $19.5 million, topping new releases 12 Strong and Den of Thieves. The film continued to do well the following week, dropping 16 percent (to $16.1 million) and finishing second to Maze Runner: The Death Cure, before regaining the top spot for a fifth time the following weekend with $10.9 million.

Jumanji: Welcome to the Jungle concluded 2017 as the fifth highest-grossing film of the year worldwide as well as the fourth highest-grossing film of 2017 in the U.S. and Canada.

Critical response
On review aggregator Rotten Tomatoes, the film holds an approval rating of 76% based on 240 reviews, and an average rating of 6.2/10. The website's critical consensus reads, "Jumanji: Welcome to the Jungle uses a charming cast and a humorous twist to offer an undemanding yet solidly entertaining update on its source material." On Metacritic, the film has a weighted average score of 58 out of 100, based on 44 critics, indicating "mixed or average reviews". Audiences polled by CinemaScore gave the film an average grade of "A−" on an A+ to F scale, while those at PostTrak gave it an 84% positive score.

Dave White of TheWrap praised the cast and called the film a pleasant surprise: "Jumanji: Welcome to The Jungle is the Christmas tentpole release that aims to please and succeeds, a funny family entertainment product that subverts more expectations than it was obligated to contractually". Peter Travers of Rolling Stone writes "enough star power and comic zest to deliver a fun time at the movies ... barely" and praises the cast, particularly Jack Black as hilarious and for finding the "vulnerable heart" of the character. Travers gives the film 2.5 stars out of 4. Peter Bradshaw of The Guardian newspaper gives the film 3 out of 5 stars. Bradshaw praises Johnson for his "endearing performance" and calls it an "amiable effort" expects that will go down well on home viewings.

David Ehrlich of IndieWire gave the film a C grade, calling it unnecessary but mildly amusing: "Jumanji: Welcome to the Jungle is further proof that even the stalest whiff of brand recognition has become preferable to originality. Only part of the blame for that belongs to the studios but after cannibalizing themselves for much of the last 20 years, Hollywood has clearly eaten their way down to the crumbs". For Variety, Owen Gleiberman wrote: "Excitement! Suspense! Childlike innocence! Ingeniously staged action set pieces! These are a few of the things you will not find, anywhere, in Jumanji: Welcome to the Jungle ... It's supposed to be a board game come to life but really, it's just a bored game."

Accolades

Video games
A mobile game titled Jumanji: The Mobile Game, developed by Idiocracy Games and published by NHN Entertainment, was released for Android and iOS on December 14, 2017. The game was removed from Google Play and App Store on May 2, 2018, and its service ended on May 24.

A virtual reality experience titled Jumanji: The VR Adventure, developed by MWM Immersive and published by Sony Pictures Virtual Reality, was released on Steam for HTC Vive on January 17, 2018. Although it was announced that the experience would be released on Oculus Rift and PlayStation VR, the releases were canceled, as the game was heavily criticized for its poor graphics and hardware performance. It was delisted from Steam on February 9, 2018.

A video game titled Jumanji: The Video Game, developed by Funsolve and published by Outright Games, was released on November 8, 2019 for PlayStation 4, Xbox One, Nintendo Switch, and Microsoft Windows. It is based on Jumanji: Welcome to the Jungle and Jumanji: The Next Level.

Sequel

Dwayne Johnson, Jack Black, and Nick Jonas discussed the plot of the next Jumanji film (referred to as Jumanji 3) in interviews, including the possibility of the film exploring the origins of the game. According to Karen Gillan, the alternate ending of Jumanji: Welcome to the Jungle would have left the door open for another installment. Kasdan returned to direct the sequel, with Rosenberg and Pinkner again writing the script and Johnson, Hart, Black, Gillan and Jonas reprising their roles. Filming began in January 2019. The film was released on December 13, 2019. Awkwafina, Danny DeVito and Danny Glover joined the cast of the film. Black also confirmed the new film as being the fourth Jumanji film because of Zathura: A Space Adventure (2005) serving as the second film and sharing continuity with the other films of the series, with Jumanji: Welcome to the Jungle serving as the third film.

Notes

References

External links

 
 

2010s fantasy adventure films
2010s science fiction comedy films
2010s fantasy comedy films
2017 3D films
2017 films
Alternate timeline films
American 3D films
IMAX films
American action adventure films
American adventure comedy films
American fantasy adventure films
American fantasy comedy films
American high school films
American sequel films
American teen films
Columbia Pictures films
Cross-dressing in American films
Films about friendship
Films about video games
Films about animals
Films based on children's books
Films based on works by Chris Van Allsburg
Films directed by Jake Kasdan
Films produced by Matt Tolmach
Films scored by Henry Jackman
Films set in 1996
Films set in 2017
Films set in New Hampshire
Films shot in Atlanta
Films shot in Hawaii
Films with screenplays by Scott Rosenberg
Films with screenplays by Chris McKenna
Films with screenplays by Erik Sommers
Jumanji
Jungle adventure films
Seven Bucks Productions films
2010s teen fantasy films
Films about virtual reality
2010s adventure comedy films
2017 comedy films
2010s English-language films
2010s American films